Septimus Atterbury (18 October 1880 – 1964) was an English footballer who made 88 appearances in the Football League for Loughborough, Barnsley, Leicester Fosse and Plymouth Argyle, and 410 in the Southern League for Swindon Town and Plymouth Argyle. He was a full back.

Life and career
He began his football career with Kettering before representing Loughborough, Barnsley, Wellingborough, and Leicester Fosse. He moved to Swindon Town in July 1903, where he made more than one hundred appearances for the club in the Southern League, and then he was signed by Plymouth Argyle in July 1907. He would feature for the club as a player until 1921; making 361 appearances in all competitions and scoring six goals. He played for Leicester Fosse during the First World War as a wartime guest.

Atterbury was selected for a Southern League representative side in 1912. He retired as a player in the summer of 1921 to become a coach. He gained a reputation for what was at the time an unconventional approach to training, which focused on stamina-building, but was considered "a great success". He served the club in this capacity until his retirement in 1937, by which time Argyle had become an established Football League Second Division side. Atterbury died in 1964 at the age of 83.

Honours
Plymouth Argyle
 Southern Football League
 Winner: 1912–13
 Runner-up: 1907–08, 1911–12

References

External links
Swindon Town Player Profile
International Statistics

1880 births
1964 deaths
Footballers from Derbyshire
English footballers
Association football fullbacks
Kettering Town F.C. players
Loughborough F.C. players
Barnsley F.C. players
Wellingborough Town F.C. players
Leicester City F.C. players
Swindon Town F.C. players
Plymouth Argyle F.C. players
English Football League players
Southern Football League players
Western Football League players
Southern Football League representative players
Plymouth Argyle F.C. non-playing staff
People from Allestree
Footballers from Derby